A urokotori  is a utensil used in Japanese cuisine to remove the scales from the skin of fish before cooking. Although it is possible to remove the scales with a knife, this is more difficult and there is a higher risk of cutting the skin of the fish, especially with small fishes; knife-scaling also risks cutting one's hand. 

The urokotori is pulled across the skin of the fish from the tail to the head repeatedly to remove the scales.

See also
List of Japanese cooking utensils

References 

Japanese food preparation utensils